Francis Mellersh (born 23 November 1786 in Slindon, Sussex; died 15 April 1849 in Slindon) was an English amateur cricketer who made 11 known appearances in first-class cricket matches from 1815 until 1830.

Career
He was mainly associated with Sussex.

References

External sources
 CricketArchive record

1786 births
1849 deaths
English cricketers
English cricketers of 1787 to 1825
English cricketers of 1826 to 1863
Sussex cricketers
Left-Handed v Right-Handed cricketers
People from Slindon